Te Uku Wind Farm is a wind farm at Te Uku near Raglan, New Zealand. It has a capacity of 64MW using 28 wind turbines. Construction was completed in March 2011, at a cost of $200 million. The wind farm is jointly owned by WEL Networks and Meridian Energy.

Resource consent was granted in May 2008 and appeals were resolved by November 2008. Construction of the wind farm began in 2010. Hick Bros Civil and Spartan Construction won an award for outstanding technical and environmental planning. The wind farm was officially opened by Prime Minister John Key in February 2011. Te Uku was fully operational on 10 March 2011.

Te Uku Windfarm is controlled from Wellington where Meridian has its control center for running all of their New Zealand Hydro and Wind generation assets.

Construction 
Each 130.5 m. high, 318 tonne, turbine took 2 or 3 days to build using 4 cranes, the largest a 600 tonne KR Wind/NZ Crane Group Alliance crane. Towers were formed in 3 sections (made in Korea), and topped by Siemens components (as at Makara) - a 3.5 m circumference, 81 tonne nacelle, hub and 3 turbine blades. Barge transport was considered, but rejected in favour of road transporters running from September 2010 to January 2011.

Pipiwharauroa Way 
One of the mitigation measures was this walking and cycling track. The track climbs from a car park on Kawhia Rd, near Bridal Veil, runs about 6 km and climbs 280m to the windfarm on Wharauroa Plateau. Over 2 km of less interesting walking can be saved if the walk is started from the gate at the end of the driveable part of Plateau Rd. From this point Lake Disappear can be seen to the south after wet weather. The track peters out into the partly formed paper road (see the dashed line on the 1:50,000 map just north of the Pakihi Stream). It follows an ancient Maori track which was often used by warriors on raids between Waikato and Kawhia.

The road access to the windfarm largely followed the paper road, which was started around 1900 (a local historian, Bob Vernon, wrote that a store ledger started at Te Mata in 1896 includes at least 11 workers on the road) and seemingly abandoned a few years later, though Bob Vernon also wrote, "about 1919 the Public Works Department cut a six-foot track through solid bush, from the south-eastern end of the plateau [where it joins this paper road] to the head of the Makomako valley".

In 2013 there was controversy between a local farmer and Waikato District Council about whether Pipiwharauroa Way could be closed for the lambing season.

Microwave tower
From the mid 1950s a microwave tower has been on the crest of the hill overlooking Te Uku. It is now also part of a smart metering network. There is also a VHF repeater near the tower.

See also 

 List of power stations in New Zealand
 Wind power in New Zealand
Pakoka River - photo of wind farm and item on mitigation work.

References

External links 
 Te Uku Wind Farm at WEL Networks - refers to 25 km transmission line to link with grid
 Siemens turbine brochure
Pipiwharauroa Way on Raglan23 website
 The towers are made of steel, not concrete. And are only 80 meters tall, with 49m blades, making a total of 130m.
 Tranzcarr Heavy Haulage with photos of the transport of the towers from Auckland
Photos of the turbines on the roads near Whatawhata

Buildings and structures in Waikato
Raglan, New Zealand
Wind farms in New Zealand